The H. H. Bloomer Award is an award of the Linnean Society, established in 1963 from a legacy by the amateur naturalist Harry Howard Bloomer, which is awarded to "an amateur naturalist who has made an important contribution to biological knowledge."
The recipients, alternatively a botanist and a zoologist, are presented with a silver medal and a donation from the Fund.

Recipients
Source (1963–present):

See also

 List of biology awards

References 

Awards established in 1963
Biology awards
British science and technology awards
Linnean Society of London